Baha al-Din Zuhayr (1186–1258) was an Arabian poet born at or near Mecca, and became celebrated as the best writer of prose and verse and the best calligrapher of his time.

Life 
He entered the service of Sultan Malik As-Salih Najm ud-Din in Mesopotamia, and was with him at Damascus until the Sultan was betrayed and imprisoned. Baha' al-din then retired to Nablus where he remained until Najm ud-Din escaped and obtained possession of Egypt, whither he accompanied him in 1240. There he remained as the Sultan's confidential secretary until his death, due to an epidemic, in 1258. 

His poetry consists mostly of panegyric and brilliant occasional verse distinguished for its elegance. It has been published with English metrical translation by E. H. Palmer (2 vols., Cambridge, 1877). 

His life was written by his contemporary Ibn Khallikan (see de Slane's trans. of his Biographical Dictionary, vol. i, pp. 542–545).

Quotes 

(translation: E.H. Palmer, The Poetical Works of Baha Ed-Din Zuheir, 2 vols., Cambridge 1877, p. 34)

References

Attribution

1186 births
1258 deaths
12th-century Arabs
13th-century Arabs
13th-century Arabic writers
Poets from the Abbasid Caliphate
Scholars from the Ayyubid Sultanate